Debra Lee may refer to:

 Debra L. Lee, American businesswoman
 Debralee Scott, American actress
 Debra Lee Hovey, American politician